WIMT (102.1 FM, "American Country T102") is a commercial FM radio station licensed to Lima, Ohio, operating at 102.1 MHz with a country music format. Its studios and offices are located on West Market Street in Lima, with its transmitter located just outside Buckland, between Wapakoneta and Lima.

Early history
Originally WIMA-FM was a simulcast of WIMA (AM) until 1973 when FM programming became separate as "Country Lovin' WIMA-FM." At first the format was automated and in mono but switched to stereo and live personalities in 1979. It became known briefly as WIQA "Q-102" in 1981 but switched again one year later to the present call letters.
T-102 was once home to the 9th ranked best on-air personality in the United States, Gordy Price (1949-2009). His style is still used on this station to this day.

Station ownership
1954 - 1964 OHIO STATE BROADCASTING -- also owned WIMA-AM in Lima
1964 - 1980 NORTHWEST OHIO BROADCASTING -- co-owned WIMA-AM / WLOK-TV Lima, WNDH-AM / WNDH-FM Napoleon
1980 - 1986 OHIO BROADCASTING LLC -- co-owned WSOM-AM / WSOM-FM Youngstown, WSTK-AM / WSTK-FM Canton
1986 - 1998 LIMA TELECASTING -- bought or purchased WMLX-FM and WBUK-FM Lima
1998 - 2000 JACOR COMMUNICATIONS -- owned multiple markets across the country
2000 -  CLEAR CHANNEL COMMUNICATIONS now  -- owns 800+ radio stations across the country

References

External links
T102 website

Gordy Price obit from Lima News website

Lima, Ohio
IMT
Country radio stations in the United States
Radio stations established in 1954
IHeartMedia radio stations